Wilson G. Smith (19 August 1855, Elyria – 26 February 1929, Cleveland) was an American composer and writer. Smith's full name was Wilson George Smith. He was a student of Otto Singer, as well as a student of Moritz Moszkowski, Oskar Raif, and Xavier Scharwenka during his time in Berlin. One of his major works is Homage to Edward Grieg.

Notes

References

External links
 

1855 births
1929 deaths
American composers